Kagghamra is a village in Botkyrka Municipality, Stockholm County, southeastern Sweden. According to the 2005 census it had a population of 139 people.

References

Stockholm urban area
Populated places in Botkyrka Municipality
Södermanland